Allgäu Railway may refer to:

Allgäu Railway (Bavaria), now operated as the Munich–Buchloe railway and the Buchloe–Lindau railway
Allgäu Railway (Württemberg), now operated as the Herbertingen–Isny railway